Vyacheslav Yevgenyevich Dayev (born 6 September 1972) is a Russian association football coach and a former player. He is an assistant coach with the Under-21 squad of FC Lokomotiv Moscow.

Playing career
He has played eight matches for Russia national football team and was a participant at the 2002 FIFA World Cup.

Coaching career
After finishing his playing career he worked a children's coach in Torpedo Moscow football school. In 2007, he was appointed as a caretaker manager at Torpedo after Georgi Yartsev was sacked. Daev was remaining at that position for five weeks until he was replaced by Ravil Sabitov.

Next year Ravil Sabitov was sacked and Dayev became Torpedo Moscow caretaker again. He went on to manage the Russia national under-19 football team.

Honours
 Russian Cup winner in 2002

References

External links
 Profile at RussiaTeam
 

1972 births
Sportspeople from Tula, Russia
Living people
Soviet footballers
Association football defenders
Russian footballers
Russia international footballers
FC Baltika Kaliningrad players
PFC Krylia Sovetov Samara players
FC Torpedo Moscow players
PFC CSKA Moscow players
FC Shinnik Yaroslavl players
2002 FIFA World Cup players
Russian Premier League players
Russian football managers
FC Torpedo Moscow managers
FC Kristall Smolensk players
FC Iskra Smolensk players
FC Znamya Truda Orekhovo-Zuyevo players